Devin Antoine Gray (May 31, 1972 – August 17, 2013) was an American professional basketball player.  He played parts of three seasons in the National Basketball Association (NBA) for the Sacramento Kings, San Antonio Spurs and Houston Rockets and played in Spain's first division.  He played college basketball at Clemson University.

Gray died of a heart attack on August 17, 2013 in Atlanta, Georgia.

References

External links
Spanish League profile

1972 births
2013 deaths
American expatriate basketball people in Spain
American expatriate basketball people in Venezuela
American men's basketball players
Basketball players from Baltimore
Real Betis Baloncesto players
CB Valladolid players
Clemson Tigers men's basketball players
Houston Rockets players
Liga ACB players
Sacramento Kings players
San Antonio Spurs players
Sioux Falls Skyforce (CBA) players
Small forwards
Undrafted National Basketball Association players
Yakima Sun Kings players